Gunderich of Trier, also Gundwich (fl. c. 600) was a bishop of Trier, born in the 6th century.

Gunderich may well have become bishop of Trier as early as 586/588; he apparently remained bishop until his death some time before 614. He is known only from a bishops' list, in which he is placed after Magnerich,: he was therefore the second bishop of Trier of Germanic origin.  He was reportedly buried in Trier Cathedral.

See also
Catholic Church in Germany

References

6th-century Frankish bishops
6th-century Christian saints
Roman Catholic bishops of Trier
Saints of Germania
Year of birth unknown